99 North may refer to:

 99 North (record label), sub-label of Higher State
 Visitors’ Guide to Whistler Blackcomb
 Interstate 99
 A US Highway